The following table compares cognitive architectures.

See also
 List of artificial intelligence projects

External links

 A Survey of Cognitive and Agent Architectures by the Artificial Intelligence Lab, University of Michigan
 A Framework for Comparing Agent Architectures by Aaron Sloman and Matthias Scheutz, Originally Published in Proceedings UKCI'02, UK Workshop on Computational Intelligence, September 2002, Birmingham, UK
 Feature-by-Feature Comparison of Cognitive Architectures started on October 2009, updated for BICA-2010
 cogarch.org Cognitive Architecture Wiki
 Sigma Cognitive Architecture homepage and code repository

References

 
Computing comparisons